Anton Mišovec (born 6 January 1966) is a former Czech football player and current manager.

References

External links

1966 births
Living people
Czech footballers
Czech football managers
1. FC Tatran Prešov managers
Czech expatriate football managers
Expatriate football managers in Slovakia
Czech expatriate sportspeople in Slovakia

Association footballers not categorized by position
SK Slavia Prague (women) managers